Bill or Billy Mitchell may refer to:

People

In arts and entertainment
 Bill Mitchell (artistic director) (1951–2017), founder of theatre company Wildworks
 Billy Mitchell (pianist) (born 1943), American jazz pianist
 Billy Mitchell (saxophonist) (1926–2001), American jazz tenor saxophonist
 Billy Mitchell, performer on the Canadian television game show Acting Crazy (1991–1994)
 Billy Mitchell, performer with the American rhythm and blues/doo-wop vocal group the Clovers
 Billy Mitchell, performer with the English folk rock and progressive rock band Lindisfarne
 Billy Mitchell, performer with the folk rock/electric folk group Jack the Lad
 Billy Mitchell (EastEnders), fictional character from the BBC soap opera EastEnders

In sports
 Bill Mitchell (Canadian football) (born 1935), former award-winning professional Canadian football centre
 Bill Mitchell (ice hockey) (1930–2014), Canadian professional ice hockey defenceman
 Billy Mitchell (rugby) (1890–1959), New Zealand rugby footballer
 Billy Mitchell (billiards player) (1854–1931), player of English billiards
 Billy Mitchell (footballer, born 1910) (1910–1977), Irish footballer
 Billy Mitchell (footballer, born 2001), English professional footballer

In other fields
 Bill Mitchell (automobile designer) (1912–1988), American automobile designer
 Bill Mitchell (economist) (born 1952), professor of economics at the University of Newcastle
 Bill Mitchell (politician) (born 1960), Republican member of the Illinois House of Representatives
 Billy Mitchell (1879–1936), United States Army general
 Billy Mitchell (politician), member of the Georgia House of Representatives
 Billy Mitchell (loyalist) (1940–2006), Northern Irish community activist
 Billy Mitchell (gamer) (born 1965), American video game player

Places
 Billy Mitchell (volcano), a volcano in the central part of the island of Bougainville
 Billy Mitchell Airport, a public use airport in Dare County, North Carolina

See also
 William Mitchell (disambiguation)
 Willie Mitchell (disambiguation)

Mitchell, Bill